Bronislavia is a genus of beetles in the family Carabidae, containing the following species:

 Bronislavia kryzhanovskii Mikhailov, 1970
 Bronislavia lopatini Mikhailov, 1970
 Bronislavia robusta Semenov, 1891

References

Harpalinae